The Seal of Biliteracy (SoBL) is an award granted by a school, district, organization or state in the United States of America, "In recognition of students who have studied and attained proficiency in two or more languages by high school graduation". The SoBL is meant to encourage students towards biliteracy in their first language and in a second language.  In the United States, one of the two languages must be English (with the exception of Hawaii, where English or Hawaiian is required). It originated in California in 2008 and was formally adopted by the state in 2011.  Thirty-nine States and the District of Columbia now offer a State Seal of Biliteracy.  For adults, university students or students in schools unable to participate in a state program, the Global Seal of Biliteracy offers a Seal of Biliteracy language credential.

About 
The Seal of Biliteracy is an award given by a school, school district or county office of education in recognition of students who have studied and attained proficiency in two or more languages by high school graduation. The Seal of Biliteracy takes the form of a seal that appears on the transcript or diploma of the graduating senior and is a statement of accomplishment for future employers and for college admissions. In addition to the Seal of Biliteracy that marks attainment of high level mastery of two or more languages, schools and districts are also instituting Bilingual Pathway Awards, recognizing significant steps towards developing biliteracy along a student's trajectory from preschool into high school.  Candidates for the SoBL can be bilingual in any two languages, which includes American Sign Language, and should have proficiency in all language domains such as listening, speaking, reading and writing. Scholars such as Kristin J. Davin and Amy J. Heineke have stated that the program's benefits are stronger efforts for academic success, bilingualism, and official recognition for their efforts.

In the United States, biliteracy has not always been the method of teaching English to English Language Learners (ELLs). In the past ELLs learned through the Sink or Swim method of total English immersion education, not having culturally relevant testing questions, or equitable assessment in schools. The intent behind the SoBL is that it will "offer a promising policy solution to increase biliteracy among K–12 students, both as a means to promote the maintenance of students' home languages and encourage native English speakers to study additional languages" and make them "attractive to future employers".

History and eligibility 
The SoBL was first developed in California in 2008 by Californians Together and was implemented in 2010 along with Velázquez Press. In 2011, legislation creating a California State Seal of Biliteracy was passed. Since then, it has been adopted by multiple states, and each state has established its own award criteria. It is only awarded to students in the public school system; students in private schools are generally not eligible. The Global Seal of Biliteracy, which was founded in 2018 by Avant Assessment, fills the gaps by offering a language credential to anyone of any age who meets the award criteria which are established by an independent board of advisors. In order to obtain the Global Seal students must pass one of a number of proficiency exams that have been approved by the board of advisors. The SoBL has been adopted into legislature in multiple states and the District of Columbia, however elements defined as barriers to success by students include a lack of awareness of the Seal and the assessment exams needed to obtain the Seal. Many students expressed a lack of awareness and preparedness until their senior year of high school, and this made them ineligible for the seal. Research suggests that successful programs implement benchmark testing and provide Seal of Biliteracy program information on school websites.

Areas and date of adoption

References

Further reading 
  
 
 

Language education
Sign language
American education awards